The 2010 Malaysia FA Cup, also known as the 2010 TM Piala FA due to the competition's sponsorship by TM, was the 21st season of the Malaysia FA Cup.

Negeri Sembilan FA has won the competition after defeating Kedah FA in the final.

Format
The Piala FA competition reverted to the old format of play with no more open draws. It involved 30 teams — 16 Super League and 14 Premier League sides — with defending champions Selangor FA and Kelantan FA receiving byes in the first round.

First round
The first leg matches were played on 2 February 2010 while the second legs were held on 6 February 2010.

|}

Second round

The first leg matches was played on 16 February 2010, and the second legs was held on 20 February 2010.

|}

Quarter-finals

The first leg matches was played on 9 March 2010, and the second legs was held on 20 March 2010.

|}

Semi-finals

The first leg matches was played on 30 March 2010, and the second legs was held on 3 April 2010.

|}

Finals

The final was played at National Stadium, Bukit Jalil, Kuala Lumpur, on Saturday, 10 April 2010.

Negeri Sembilan win 5–4 on penalties'''

Winners

References

External links
 Football Association Malaysia

 
2010 domestic association football cups
Piala FA